Aderkomyces is a genus of lichens in the family Gomphillaceae. It was circumscribed by Brazilian mycologist Augusto Chaves Batista in 1961.

Species
, Species Fungorum accepts 28 species of Aderkomyces.
Aderkomyces albostrigosus 
Aderkomyces armatus 
Aderkomyces brevipilosus 
Aderkomyces carneoalbus 
Aderkomyces couepiae 
Aderkomyces cretaceus 
Aderkomyces cubanus 
Aderkomyces deslooveri 
Aderkomyces dilatatus 
Aderkomyces fumosus 
Aderkomyces gomezii 
Aderkomyces guatemalensis 
Aderkomyces heterellus 
Aderkomyces lobulimarginatus 
Aderkomyces microcarpus 
Aderkomyces microtrichus 
Aderkomyces papilliferus 
Aderkomyces planus 
Aderkomyces purulhensis 
Aderkomyces ramiferus 
Aderkomyces rigidus 
Aderkomyces sikkimensis 
Aderkomyces subalbostrigosus 
Aderkomyces subplanus 
Aderkomyces testaceus 
Aderkomyces thailandicus 
Aderkomyces verruciferus 
Aderkomyces verrucosus

References

Ostropales
Lichen genera
Ostropales genera
Taxa described in 1961